Relish is a cooked and pickled condiment made from chopped fruit or vegetables
 Henderson's Relish, a spicy and fruity condiment sauce made in Sheffield
 Gentleman's Relish, an anchovy paste
Relish may also refer to:

People
 John Relish (born 1953), English football manager and former player
 Nickname of Arielle Gold, American world champion and Olympic bronze medalist snowboarder
Fictional characters

Books
 Relish (magazine), an American magazine, website, and cooking show

Music
 Relish (Northern Irish band), a Northern Irish rock band
 Relish (American band), an American rock band
 Relish (album), an album by Joan Osborne

Other uses
 A common translation of the word "" opson, the part of a meal not constituting the staple starch, in discussions of ancient Greek cuisine

See also